The 2009 Pukka Pies UK Championship was a professional ranking snooker tournament that took place between 5–13 December 2009 at the Telford International Centre in Telford, England.

This was the first time that the UK Championship was sponsored by Pukka Pies. Shaun Murphy was the defending champion but he lost 3–9 to Ding Junhui in the Last 16. Ding won the tournament for his second UK title, beating John Higgins 10–8 in the final  .

Prize fund
The breakdown of prize money for this year is shown below:

Winner: £100,000
Runner-up: £46,000
Semi-final: £23,250
Quarter-final: £16,450
Last 16: £12,050
Last 32: £8,750
Last 48: £5,500
Last 64: £2,300

Stage one highest break: £500
Stage two highest break: £5,000

Stage one maximum break: £1,000
Stage two maximum break: £25,000

Total: £625,000

Main draw

* Dott withdrew due to illness.

Final

Qualifying
These matches were held between 23 and 30 November 2009 at the Pontin's Centre, Prestatyn, Wales.

Century breaks

Televised stage centuries

 141, 136, 132, 115, 102, 101  Mark Selby
 141, 103  Stephen Lee
 137, 127, 119, 100  Neil Robertson
 134, 118, 116, 114, 110, 104  Ronnie O'Sullivan
 134, 114, 113  Ding Junhui
 130, 115, 112, 108  Stephen Hendry
 129, 127, 116, 115, 115, 110, 109  John Higgins
 125  Ryan Day
 124, 102  Ali Carter

 124  Liang Wenbo
 121, 112, 104, 100  Mark Allen
 119, 101  Shaun Murphy
 114  Peter Lines
 108, 103  Stephen Maguire
 104  Marco Fu
 101  Matthew Stevens
 100  Jamie Cope

Qualifying stage centuries

 143, 125, 110, 104  Tom Ford
 141  Stuart Bingham
 138, 101  Thepchaiya Un-Nooh
 135, 115  Jimmy Robertson
 134  Brendan O'Donoghue
 129, 110  Stephen Lee
 128  David Gilbert
 127, 108  Simon Bedford
 127, 103  Liang Wenbo
 122  Mark Joyce
 120  Anthony Hamilton
 114, 113, 105, 101, 100  Peter Lines
 113, 100  Tony Drago

 111  Lee Spick
 111  Robert Milkins
 111  Rod Lawler
 108  David Gray
 107  Matthew Stevens
 106  Matthew Couch
 104, 102  Rory McLeod
 104, 100  Craig Steadman
 103  Mark Davis
 102  Xiao Guodong
 100  David Morris
 100  Dominic Dale
 100  Andrew Higginson

References

2009
UK Championship
Championship (snooker)
UK Championship